Sutton Creek may refer to:

Sutton Creek (Ireland)
Sutton Creek (Susquehanna River), a tributary of the Susquehanna River in Luzerne County, Pennsylvania